Rijan may refer to:

 Rijan, Fars, a village in Beyza Rural District, Beyza District, Sepidan County, Fars Province, Iran
 Rijan, Markazi, a village in Jushaq Rural District, in the Central District of Delijan County, Markazi Province, Iran
 Node (singer) (Rijan Nabaz), Danish singer known as Rijan

See also
 Rian, a surname and given name
 Rihan (disambiguation)